Emil Petersen is a Danish motorcycle racer. In 2011, he participated for the first time in a 125cc World Championship event as a wild-card rider in the season finale at Valencia, but failed to qualify for the race.

Career statistics

Grand Prix motorcycle racing

By season

Races by year 
(key)

References

External links 
 http://www.motogp.com/en/riders/Emil+Petersen

Living people
Danish motorcycle racers
125cc World Championship riders
Year of birth missing (living people)